Seongdong District (Seongdong-gu) is one of the 25 gu which make up the city of Seoul, South Korea. It is situated on the north bank of the Han River. It is divided into 20 dong (neighbourhoods).

Administrative divisions

Seongdong District consists of 20 administrative dongs (haengjeong-dong)

 Doseon-dong
 Hongik-dong: legal dong (beopjeong-dong)
 Eungbong-dong
 Haengdang-dong 1∼2
 Geumho-dong 1∼4
 Majang-dong
 Oksu-dong 1∼2
 Sageun-dong
 Seongsu 1ga 1 dong
 Seongsu 1ga 2 dong
 Seongsu 2ga 1-dong
 Seongsu 2ga 3-dong
 Songjeong-dong
 Yongdap-dong
 Wangsimni-dong 1∼2
 Sangwangsimni-dong: legal dong (beopjeong-dong)
 Hawangsimni-dong: legal dong (beopjeong-dong)

Transportation

Railways
KORAIL
Jungang Line
(Dongdaemun-gu) ← Wangsimni ─ Eungbong ─ Oksu → (Yongsan-gu)
Bundang Line
Wangsimni ─ Seoul Forest  → (Gangnam-gu)
Seoul Metro
Seoul Underground Line 2
(Jung-gu) ← Sangwangsimni ─ Wangsimni ─ Hanyang University ─ Ttukseom ─ Seongsu → (Gwangjin-gu)
Seoul Underground Branch for Sinseol-dong of Line 2
Seongsu ─ Yongdap ─ Sindap → (Dongdaemun-gu)
Seoul Underground Line 3
(Jung-gu) ← Geumho ─ Oksu → (Gangnam-gu)
Seoul Metropolitan Rapid Transit Corporation
Seoul Underground Line 5
(Jung-gu) ← Singeumho ─ Haengdang─ Wangsimni ─ Majang → (Dongdaemun-gu)

History
When Seoul was expanding outward on its size, many parts of Gyeonggi Province were merged to Seongdong District. However, due to its extraordinarily huge size, Seoul Metropolitan Government divided the district into 5 (Gangnam District, Gangdong District, Gwangjin District, Seongdong District, and Songpa District), and made Seongdong District cede some part of the district to Jung District. Yeongdeungpo District, Seodaemun District, Seongbuk District, and Dongdaemun District underwent similar changes.

Sister cities

 Hampyeong County, South Jeolla
 Huairou District, Beijing, China
 Jincheon County, North Chungcheong
 Seocheon County, South Chungcheong
 Cobb County, Georgia, United States

References

  This explains why Gangdong District Office is located in a corner of Gangdong District. The building was previously used as Seongdong District Office.

External links

Official site 
Official site 

 
Districts of Seoul